Sphaerophoria interrupta is a Palearctic species of hoverfly.

Description
External images
For terms see Morphology of Diptera
Wing length 4·5-6·25 mm. Tergites 2–4 with pairs of spots, which may merge in the middle and hairs on lateral margin of tergites 3-5 pale. Genitalia figured by Verinden Verlinden, L. (1991) . See references for determination.

Distribution
Palearctic Fennoscandia South to Iberia and the Mediterranean basin. Ireland East through Europe and European Russia and the Caucasus then to Siberia and Lake Baikal.

References

Diptera of Europe
Syrphini
Insects described in 1805